Wilmington Bridge is a historic concrete arch bridge over the Ausable River at Wilmington in Essex County, New York. It was built in 1934 and is an arch bridge faced with stone, 37 feet wide and spanning 160 feet (two 70 feet arch spans) at roughly 24 feet, 8 inches above water level. The bridge is maintained by the New York State Department of Public Works.

It was listed on the National Register of Historic Places in 1999.

References

Road bridges on the National Register of Historic Places in New York (state)
Bridges completed in 1934
Bridges in Essex County, New York
National Register of Historic Places in Essex County, New York
Arch bridges in the United States
Concrete bridges in the United States
1934 establishments in New York (state)